Hunger (Loxias Crown) is a fictional character appearing in the American comic books published by Marvel Comics. The character first appeared in Spider-Man #76 (January 1997) and was created by Howard Mackie. He is an enemy of Spider-Man, Blade, and Morbius, the Living Vampire.

Matt Smith portrayed a composite character partially inspired by Hunger named Milo whose real name is Lucien in the Sony's Spider-Man Universe (SSU) film Morbius (2022).

Publication history
Created by Howard Mackie, the character first appeared in Spider-Man #76 (January 1997).

Fictional character biography
Loxias Crown was an agent of Hydra equipped with armor that manipulates darkforce. After killing the armor's creator, William Fields, Crown takes Empire State University's staff and students as hostages to locate Fields' notes on his armor's technology, but is defeated by Spider-Man and S.H.O.C. Crown next abducted Morbius, the Living Vampire to perform experiments alongside Dr. Andrea Janson for Don Fortunato. Crown threatened Peter Parker until Todd Fields (now known as Neil Aiken) surrendered, teleporting the two youths to his secret base. But after Hammerhead killed his love and captured his three hostages, Crown took Hydra's airship to get revenge. He fought both Spider-Man and S.H.O.C. and prepared to overload the latter's armor to kill everyone, but Morbius attacked and drained him dry while disappearing in the process.

Crown next lived in New York City's sewers as a "Living Vampire" known as Hunger, an enforcer of Senator Stuart Ward. He abducted innocent civilians and the Morlocks' leader Callisto to his lair beneath the streets. The Daily Bugle went to investigate but Hunger knocked Parker out and took Betty Brant hostage. Spider-Man teamed up with Marrow to free the prisoners, much to Hunger's annoyance. Flash Thompson distracted Hunger, resulting in his defeat by Spider-Man and Marrow but escapes in energy form. Hunger later attacked a clandestine meeting between the Kingpin and the Maggia, and turned a number of gangsters into his own small army of living vampires. Blade and Spider-Man tracked Hunger down to an abandoned Roxxon plant, fighting the two superheroes until he fled after his horde's deaths.

Powers and abilities
Initially, Loxias Crown wore an armor similar to S.H.O.C. which gave him the ability to channel negative energy and fire energy blasts. 

As a "Living Vampire", Hunger does not possess all the powers of a supernatural vampire, nor is he subject to all the traditional limitations and weaknesses thereof. He possesses a variety of superhuman powers, some of which are similar to supernatural vampires within the Marvel Universe, such as superhuman strength, speed and durability, as well as heightened senses including night vision and echolocation. Due to his vampire-like condition, Hunger is forced to ingest fresh blood on a regular basis to sustain his life and vitality. He does not possess any of the mystical vulnerabilities that supernatural vampires are subject to, such as garlic, holy water, crucifixes, or silver. He has a strong aversion to sunlight, thanks to his photo-sensitive skin which allows some protection from major sunburn, in contrast to "true" vampires that are incinerated by it, with the result that he can move in daylight, but his powers are diminished and he will stick to the shade if circumstances demand him to be active during the day.

Reception
 In 2022, CBR.com ranked Hunger 9th in their "10 Most Important Marvel Vampires" list.

In other media

Film
 A composite character partly inspired by Hunger along with Emil Nikos and Vic Slaughter named Lucien, also known as Milo, appears in the live-action Sony's Spider-Man Universe film Morbius (2022), portrayed by Matt Smith as an adult, and Joseph Esson as a child. Lucien, nicknamed "Milo", is Michael Morbius's surrogate brother and best friend, having met under the care of Dr. Emil Nicholas as both are suffering from a rare blood disease which prevented their bodies from properly being able to create blood. Milo's family wealth is key to Morbius's research for a cure, but causes "pseudo-vampirism", with Morbius seeking to resist the resulting bloodlust while Milo embraces it. After Milo kills Nicholas and fatally injures Dr. Martine Bancroft, Morbius restrains Milo with an army of vampire bats and kills him with a vampire-antibody.

References

External links
 Loxias Crown at Marvel Wiki
 Hunger at marvel.com

Comics characters introduced in 1997
Characters created by Howard Mackie
Fictional characters with superhuman senses
Hydra (comics) agents
Marvel Comics characters who can move at superhuman speeds
Marvel Comics characters with accelerated healing
Marvel Comics characters with superhuman strength
Marvel Comics mutates
Marvel Comics vampires
Marvel Comics supervillains
Marvel Comics male supervillains
Spider-Man characters
Film supervillains